The Monaco Yacht Show (MYS) is an annual trade show in Monaco, organised by the British events and publishing company, Informa. It is held in Port Hercules, and is Europe's biggest in-water display of large yachts.

In addition to the estimated 125 yachts on display, over 580 exhibitors including brokerage companies, superyacht builders, yacht designers, luxury brands, and luxury automobile companies participate in the event. 

Throughout the four-day event, there are over 150 private events including press features conferences, receptions and product presentations. 

In 2020, Informa cancelled the show due to the world wide COVID-19 pandemic.

History
The Monaco Yacht Show was founded in 1991 and organized by the French entrepreneur Maurice Cohen. In 1994, the rights to the event were sold to IIR, a management company that also held the rights to the Superyacht de Nice event. 

The event grew to host 65 yachts in 2002 and attracted nearly 15,000 visitors. In 2005, IIR was acquired by the British event organizer Informa for $1.4 billion. 

By 2016, the event had more than doubled its 2002 attendance numbers and increased the number of yachts in Port Hercules to 125. That same year, the Monaco Yacht Show debuted an exhibition space for luxury automobiles called Car Deck. 

The Car Deck exhibition has included automobiles from Aston Martin, Bentley, Hemmels, Lamborghini, McLaren, and Mercedes-Benz. In 2017, there was an estimated €4.5 billion value in yachts in Monaco during the event.

Notable yachts
 Illusion 1
 Project Sunrise
 ROCK.IT
 Infinity
 Thumper
 Anyuta
 Jubilee
 O'Mega

References

External links
 Comprehensive guide to Monaco 
 Monaco Yacht Show photos

Boat shows
Trade fairs in Monaco
Monegasque culture
Sailing in Monaco